Jimmy Gerard Cordero (born October 19, 1991) is a Dominican professional baseball pitcher for the New York Yankees of Major League Baseball (MLB). He previously played for the Washington Nationals, Toronto Blue Jays, and Chicago White Sox.

Career

Toronto Blue Jays
Cordero signed with the Toronto Blue Jays as an international free agent in January 2012. Cordero spent time in the minors with the Blue Jays organization through the 2015 season.

Philadelphia Phillies
The Blue Jays traded Cordero along with Alberto Tirado to the Philadelphia Phillies for Ben Revere on July 31, 2015. The Phillies added him to their 40-man roster after the 2015 season.

Washington Nationals
In December 2016, the Phillies completed a trade with the Washington Nationals, sending Cordero in exchange for minor league pitcher Mario Sanchez. He started the 2017 season pitching for the Class-AA Harrisburg Senators of the Eastern League. The Nationals designated him for assignment, removing him from their 40-man roster, on July 31, 2017, to make room for the acquisition of closer Brandon Kintzler. After being outrighted to Harrisburg, he finished his season with a 6.84 ERA over 51⅓ innings. He was invited to participate in the Nationals' 2018 spring training camp the following year.

Cordero was promoted to the major leagues on August 1, 2018, after the Nationals designated veteran reliever Shawn Kelley for assignment. He made his major league debut on August 2 against the Cincinnati Reds. He spent the early weeks of the  season with the Nationals′ Class AAA affiliate, the Fresno Grizzlies of the Pacific Coast League, where he compiled a 6.00 ERA, 1.73 WHIP, and 17-to-9 strikeout-to-walk ratio in 15 innings of work. On May 9, 2019, the Nationals signed outfielder Gerardo Parra to a one-year deal and designated Cordero for assignment to make room for Parra on their 40-man roster.

Second Stint with Blue Jays
The Toronto Blue Jays claimed Cordero off waivers on May 15, 2019, and assigned him to the Class AAA Buffalo Bisons of the International League. He was recalled on May 21, and designated for assignment on May 23.

Seattle Mariners
On May 27, 2019, Cordero was claimed off waivers by the Seattle Mariners and assigned to the Double-A Arkansas Travelers.

Chicago White Sox
He was claimed by the Chicago White Sox on June 7. He registered an ERA of 2.75 in 30 games for Chicago. On September 26, 2020, Cordero received a 3-game suspension stemming from the night before in which he intentionally hit Chicago Cubs catcher Willson Contreras after Contreras had hit a home run and flipped his bat off of teammate Dylan Cease earlier in the game. With the 2020 Chicago White Sox, Cordero appeared in 30 games, compiling a 1–2 record with 6.08 ERA and 22 strikeouts in 26.2 innings pitched.

Cordero underwent Tommy John surgery on March 18, 2021. The surgery was performed by Dr. James Andrews. Cordero missed the entire 2021 season recovering from the surgery; he was placed on the 60-day injured list on March 21. On November 5, 2021, Cordero was outrighted off of the 40-man roster and elected free agency.

New York Yankees 
On December 16, 2021, Cordero signed a minor league deal with the New York Yankees. He had a 2.09 ERA in  innings for the Scranton/Wilkes-Barre RailRiders in 2022. After the season, the Yankees added him to their 40-man roster.

Pitching style
Cordero is known for a massive fastball that sits in the high 90s, can hit 100 mph, and has been clocked as fast as 104 mph. He also throws a slider and an occasional curveball. Throughout his career, scouts have noted Cordero's struggles to command his power pitches.

References

External links

1991 births
Living people
People from San Cristóbal, Dominican Republic
Major League Baseball players from the Dominican Republic
Dominican Republic expatriate baseball players in the United States
Major League Baseball pitchers
Washington Nationals players
Toronto Blue Jays players
Chicago White Sox players
Dominican Summer League Blue Jays players
Gulf Coast Blue Jays players
Bluefield Blue Jays players
Lansing Lugnuts players
Leones del Escogido players
Dunedin Blue Jays players
New Hampshire Fisher Cats players
Reading Fightin Phils players
Clearwater Threshers players
Lehigh Valley IronPigs players
Florida Complex League Phillies players
Harrisburg Senators players
Mesa Solar Sox players
Syracuse Chiefs players
Fresno Grizzlies players
Buffalo Bisons (minor league) players
Arkansas Travelers players
Charlotte Knights players
Scranton/Wilkes-Barre RailRiders players